Siddharth Singh (born 3 February 1993) is an Indian professional footballer who last played as a forward for Jamshedpur in the Indian Super League. Born in Mumbai, Singh has had stints with PIFA Colaba FC and DSK Shivajians.

Personal life
Siddharth Singh was born on 3 February 1993 in Mumbai, and started playing football since his childhood. He attended and played for Cathedral and John Connon School in Mumbai. He later went to England, where he studied Business management at the Nottingham Trent University.

He is son of entrepreneur Anil Singh, who founded Procam International in 1988, a company committed to elevate and enliven the professional face of sports and players.

Playing career

Earlier career

Singh began his career with PIFA Colaba FC, a team that competes in the MDFA Elite League. In 2008, after impressing coaches, Singh went to London to train at Arsenal under the Tata Tea's soccer program. Singh soon moved to England to study at Nottingham Trent University under Gary Charles. Under Charles, Singh was able to secure a move to Australia to play for Manningham United.

In 2016, Singh moved to Moldova for a training stint in top division club FC Zimbru Chișinău, that competes in the Divizia Națională.

Club career

Manningham United
In 2016, Singh moved to Australia and signed with National Premier Leagues Victoria 2 side Manningham United Blues on a one-year deal.

Jamshedpur
On 23 July 2017, Singh was selected in the 15th and last round of the 2017–18 ISL Players Draft by Jamshedpur for the 2017–18 Indian Super League season. He made his professional debut for the club on 6 December 2017 against Delhi Dynamos. He started and played 79 minutes as Jamshedpur won 1–0.

He also appeared in the 2018 Indian Super Cup with Jamshedpur, through making his debut on 2 April against Minerva Punjab FC in their 1–0 win.

East Bengal
After his stint with Jamshedpur in 2018, Singh signed a contract with I-League side East Bengal after his trial ahead of the team's Calcutta Football League season. During his days in East Bengal, Singh along with Mehtab Singh suffered head injuries due to an aerial concussion during practice at the Vivekananda Yuba Bharati Krirangan in Salt Lake on 14 November 2018.

Career statistics

Honours
PIFA Colaba
Nadkarni Cup runner-up: 2011

DSK Shivajians
Pune Football League: 2016

See also
 List of Indian football players in foreign leagues

References

External links 
 Siddharth Singh profile at Indian Super League
Siddharth Singh stats at footballcritic.com
Siddharth Singh at My Khel

https://m.facebook.com/watch/?v=922657597910164&_rdr
Siddharth Singh at Playmaker

1993 births
Living people
Indian footballers
Jamshedpur FC players
Association football forwards
Indian Super League players
Indian expatriate footballers
I-League players